The 1852 Missouri gubernatorial election was held on August 2, 1852, the Democratic nominee, Sterling Price, defeated Whig candidate James Winston.

Results

References

Missouri
1852
Gubernatorial
August 1852 events